"Through the Eyes of a Child" is a single from the German band Reamonn. The song is from their fifth studio album, Reamonn. It was released on 10 October 2008 in Germany by Universal under the Island label.

Music video

In the video, one sees the world, but drawn by children, and it is being destroyed and getting worse and worse. Parents are shown quarrelling, while whole woods are being cleared, military tanks are shooting, and icebergs are defrosting due to global warming. Cut in between these scenes, members of the band fade in and out.

Background
The song is a foretaste from the end of 2008 appearing album "Reamonn". It becomes in it the change of complex things if one sees that with the eyes of a child. Probably is, that the text Rea Garvey simply fell to write, because he has a young daughter.

Track listing

CD single 
The German "2er Track" (CD single):
 "Through the Eyes of a Child" — 3:42
 "It's Over Now" — 4:07

Charts
The song has reached the top 10 in Germany (#6) and the top 15 in Switzerland (#15) and Austria (#13).

Weekly charts

Year-end charts

References

Reamonn songs
2008 singles
2008 songs
Island Records singles
Song recordings produced by Julio Reyes Copello